Nidaga is a town in the Kokologho Department of Boulkiemdé Province in central western Burkina Faso with a population of 1,630.

References

External links
Satellite map at Maplandia.com

Populated places in Boulkiemdé Province